Shakespeare is a feature on Earth's Moon, a crater in Taurus–Littrow valley.  Astronauts Eugene Cernan and Harrison Schmitt landed southwest of it in 1972, on the Apollo 17 mission. They did not visit it, but in fact drove around it during EVA 3.

To the south is Van Serg, to the northeast is Cochise, and to the northwest is a crater unofficially called Henry on some maps.

The crater was named by the astronauts after English playwright William Shakespeare.

References

External links
Geological Investigation of the Taurus–Littrow Valley: Apollo 17 Landing Site
Shakespeare at The Moon Wiki

Impact craters on the Moon
Apollo 17